Coleophora gnaphalii is a moth of the family Coleophoridae. It is found from Sweden and the Baltic States to the Pyrenees, the Alps and Romania and from France to Russia.

The wingspan is 9–12 mm. Adults are on wing from July to August.

The larvae feed on Gnaphalium species and Helichrysum arenarium. They create a small, curved, hairy case of less than 12 mm. The mouth angle is about 30°. Full-grown larvae can be found from May to June.

References

gnaphalii
Moths described in 1839
Moths of Europe